Clarence Wetzel (February 24, 1899 – June 1972) was a member of the Ohio House of Representatives.

Hailing from Columbiana, Wetzel was a longtime politician, notably as a long term state representative. He ran for Ohio's 18th congressional district in 1952. He was defeated in 1970 by John Wargo.

References

Republican Party members of the Ohio House of Representatives
1899 births
1972 deaths
People from Columbiana, Ohio
20th-century American politicians